Nunca Fomos tão Felizes (English: Happier Than Ever) is a 1984 Brazilian film directed by Murilo Salles.

Synopsis 
Happier Than Ever tells the story of a father's relationship with his son, an unknown and mysterious man. In a thriller rhythm, it is considered by critics a milestone of modern Brazilian cinema.

Cast 
Claudio Marzo	...	Beto 
Roberto Bataglin	...	Gabriel
Susana Vieira	...	Dª. Leonor
Meiry Vieira	...	Prostituta
Ênio Santos	...	Priest Rector
Antônio Pompêo	...	Hot dog seller
Marcus Vinícius	...	father
Fábio Junqueira	...	police officer
Ângela Rebello	...	Prostitute 
Emily Combeçau		
José Mayer	...	police officer
Tonico Pereira	...	police officer
Marcelo França	...	police officer

Awards 
1984: Festival de Brasília
Best Picture (won)
Best Editing (Vera Freire) (won)

1984: Gramado Film Festival
Best Screenplay (Alcione Araújo) (won)

1984: Locarno International Film Festival
Ernest Artaria Award (Murilo Salles) (won)

References

External links 
 

1984 films
1980s Portuguese-language films
Brazilian drama films
1984 drama films